My Last Five Girlfriends is a 2009 British romantic black comedy film
directed by Julian Kemp starring Brendan Patricks, based on pop-philosopher Alain De Botton's book, Essays In Love (U.S. title On Love).

Plot
After yet another failed relationship, 30-something Duncan (Brendan Patricks) decides to quiz his last five girlfriends to find out what went wrong in order to figure out how to find love. With advice from bizarre sources and intense flights of fancy, finally Duncan realises that love is a battleground where only the fittest can survive.

Cast
 Brendan Patricks as Duncan
 Naomie Harris as Gemma
 Kelly Adams as Wendy
 Cécile Cassel as Rhona
 Jane March as Olive
 Edith Bukovics as Natalie
 Michael Sheen as Burnam
 Mark Benton as Alan
 Daniel Hoffmann-Gill as Will
 Sarah Rodriguez as Paula

Reception

Review aggregation website Rotten Tomatoes gives it a score of 32% based on reviews from 19 critics.

References

External links
 

2009 films
British comedy films
Films directed by Julian Kemp
2000s English-language films
2000s British films